Sergei Ivanovich Nozikov (born 30 March 1961) is a former Russian professional footballer.

Club career
He made his professional debut in the Soviet Second League in 1983 for FC Stroitel Cherepovets.

References

1961 births
Living people
Soviet footballers
Russian footballers
Association football midfielders
FC Chernomorets Novorossiysk players
FC Zhemchuzhina Sochi players
Russian Premier League players
FC Bulat Cherepovets players